Khamis is both a surname and a given name. Notable people with the name include:

Surname:
Abubaker Kaki Khamis (born 1989), Sudanese specializes in the 800 metres
Ahmed Khamis (born 1985), Emirati football player
Imad Khamis (born 1961), Syrian politician
Johnny Khamis, American politician 
Leena Khamis (born 1986), Australian football player
Salem Khamis (born 1980), United Arab Emirates football player 
Sham Khamis (born 1995), Australian football player
Younis Khamis (born 1982), United Arab Emirates basketball player

Given name:
Khamis Gaddafi (1983-2011) son of Muammar Gaddafi

Arabic-language surnames
Arabic masculine given names